The Portable Door is an upcoming Australian film directed by Jeffrey Walker and starring Christoph Waltz, Sam Neill, Patrick Gibson, Sophie Wilde and Miranda Otto. It is adapted from The Portable Door, the first book in Tom Holt’s J.W. Wells & Co. series. Produced by Blanca Lista and Todd Fellman with The Jim Henson Company and Story Bridge Films, the film will be available in the United Kingdom on Sky Cinema from 7 April 2023.

Synopsis
The movie centers on Paul Carpenter (Gibson) and Sophie Pettingel (Wilde), lowly, put-upon interns who begin working at the mysterious London firm J.W. Wells & Co., and become increasingly aware that their employers are anything but conventional. Charismatic villains Humphrey Wells (Waltz), the CEO of the company, and middle manager Dennis Tanner (Neill) are disrupting the world of magic by bringing modern corporate strategy to ancient magical practices, and Paul and Sophie discover the true agenda of the vast corporation.

Cast
 Christoph Waltz as Humphrey Wells
 Sam Neill as Dennis Tanner
 Patrick Gibson as Paul Carpenter
 Sophie Wilde as Sophie Pentigel
 Miranda Otto as Countess Judy
 Rachel House as Nienke Van Spee
 Jessica De Gouw as Rosie Tanner
 Chris Pang as Casimir
 Damon Herriman as Monty Smith-Gregg
 Christopher Sommers as Arthur Tanner

Production
In 2013, The Jim Henson Company and Story Bridge Films began developing the project. In February 2020, Jeffrey Walker was announced to be directing the adaptation of the first book in Tom Holt’s seven-part fantasy book series from a script written by Leon Ford with Christoph Waltz and Guy Pearce starring. Blanca Lista producing for The Jim Henson Company and Todd Fellman producing for Story Bridge Films. In May 2021, the cast was announced, including Christoph Waltz, Sam Neill, Patrick Gibson, Sophie Wilde and Miranda Otto, with production scheduled to begin at Pinnacle Studios on the Gold Coast, Queensland.

Broadcast
In June 2021, the film was announced as having a theatrical release in Australia through Madman Entertainment, whilst it was to be shown as a Sky Original in the United Kingdom and Ireland, Germany and Italy. In February 2023, it was announced the film will be available in the United Kingdom on Sky Cinema, in Australia on Stan, and in the United States as an MGM+ original film from 7 April 2023.

References

External links

Upcoming films
2020s Australian films
2020s English-language films
2023 comedy films
Films shot in Queensland
The Jim Henson Company films
Films based on fantasy novels